Crown Convention Center is an indoor arena in Nha Trang, Khánh Hòa, Vietnam. It is the third biggest Convention Center on Southeast Asia, placed after the Sentul International Convention Center  in Indonesia, with an arena of 1,500 square meters, and was built in 2008. The Diamond Bay or the Nha Trang Tourism and Entertainment Area is 14 km away from the centre of the Nha Trang city. The 7,500-seat center is equipped with an audio and lightning system imported from the USA. The venue was opened in July 2008 to host the Miss Universe of that year.

External links
 DiamonBay Resort & Golf official website
 Khanh Hoa Tourism

Convention centers in Vietnam
Buildings and structures in Khánh Hòa province
Tourist attractions in Khánh Hòa province